Elizabeth College may refer to:

 Elizabeth College (Hobart), Tasmania, Australia
 Elizabeth College (Guernsey), Channel Islands
 Elizabeth College (Virginia), United States

See also
 Elizabeth City State University, North Carolina